Gunnar Kemnitz (16 December 1927 – 27 December 2009) was a Brazilian diver. He competed in the men's 3 metre springboard event at the 1948 Summer Olympics.

References

External links
 

1927 births
2009 deaths
Brazilian male divers
Olympic divers of Brazil
Divers at the 1948 Summer Olympics
Divers from São Paulo
20th-century Brazilian people